Bruce Goldsmith was a sailor from Michigan. He won twice the Worlds in the Lightning class, was many times North American Champion in several classes as well as gold medalist in the 1967 and 1975 Pan Am Games. He died in 2007 at the age of 71 while racing during a storm on Lake Erie.

References

American male sailors (sport)
Soling class sailors
1936 births
2007 deaths
Lightning class world champions
World champions in sailing for the United States
Pan American Games medalists in sailing
Pan American Games gold medalists for the United States
Sailors at the 1967 Pan American Games
Sailors at the 1975 Pan American Games
Medalists at the 1967 Pan American Games
Medalists at the 1975 Pan American Games